Moezzabad or Moez Abad may refer to:
 Moezzabad-e Gurgir
 Moezzabad-e Jaberi